Professor Wong Yuk-shan, SBS, BBS, JP (born 1950) is a Hong Kong politician and academic. He is the former president of the Open University of Hong Kong, a Hong Kong deputy of the National People's Congress of China and its member of the Committee of the Hong Kong Basic Law.

Biography
Professor Wong was born in Hong Kong in 1950; his ancestral home is located in Fujian, mainland China. He graduated from Concordia University with a bachelor's degree in biology in 1974, before obtaining a master's and doctoral degree in Plant Biochemistry from McGill University in 1976 and 1979 respectively. From the 1980s, Wong has performed teaching, research and administration work at various universities, namely the Hong Kong Polytechnic University, Chinese University of Hong Kong, City University of Hong Kong and the Hong Kong University of Science and Technology. He has published 8 books and over 160 international journal papers in the areas of environmental biotechnology, plant biochemistry and mangrove conservation. He is a Fellow of the Society of Biology in the UK and a Fellow of the Hong Kong Institution of Science.

He has been a Hong Kong deputy of the National People's Congress since 2008 and a member of its Committee of the Hong Kong Basic Law. He has also held various public positions, including member of the Basic Law Promotion Steering Committee, chairman of the Education Bureau's Vetting Committee for the Allocation of Sites and Start-up Loan for Post-secondary Education
Providers, the president of the Society of Hong Kong Scholars, chairman of the Veterinary Surgeons Board of Hong Kong, Deputy Chairman of the Advisory Council for the Environment, Chairman of Wetland Advisory Committee and member of the Executive Board
of the Hong Kong Institution of Science. In 2001 he was appointed chairman of the Curriculum Development Council, a member of the University Grants Committee, a member of Education Commission and a member of the Hong Kong Council for Accreditation of Academic and Vocational Qualifications. He was appointed chairman of the Consumer Council in 2013 and chairman of the Standing Committee on Judicial Salaries and Conditions of Service in 2017.
 
Wong was appointed Justice of Peace in 2001 and received a Bronze Bauhinia Star medal in 2004. He received a Silver Bauhinia Star medal in 2018.

References

1950 births
Living people
Delegates to the 11th National People's Congress from Hong Kong
Delegates to the 12th National People's Congress from Hong Kong
Delegates to the 13th National People's Congress from Hong Kong
Academic staff of Hong Kong Polytechnic University
Hong Kong scientists
Heads of universities in Hong Kong
Academic staff of Hong Kong Metropolitan University
McGill University Faculty of Science alumni
Concordia University alumni
Recipients of the Bronze Bauhinia Star
Members of the Election Committee of Hong Kong, 2021–2026
Academic staff of the Hong Kong University of Science and Technology